View from the Vault, Volume Four (styled as View from the Vault IV) is the fourth release in the "View from the Vault" series of rock concert recordings by the Grateful Dead. Like the other entries in the series, it was released simultaneously on CD and as a DVD concert video. However, unlike the previous 3-CD volumes, View from the Vault IV is a 4-CD set. This volume contains selections from two consecutive shows in California — July 24, 1987, at Oakland Stadium, and July 26, 1987 at Anaheim Stadium.

These concerts were recorded during the "Dylan & the Dead" tour.  On this brief tour, the Grateful Dead played two sets followed by a performance by Bob Dylan, with the Dead providing his accompaniment (some of those performances are documented on the album Dylan & the Dead). All four Dead sets from these two dates are included in the release, but the sets with Dylan are not. Also not included are the "Touch of Grey" encores the Dead played both nights with Dylan on guitar (followed by an additional Dylan song). Additionally, the CD version includes "Friend of the Devil", "Me & My Uncle", and "Big River", which do not appear on the DVD.

View from the Vault IV was the first "View from the Vault" that was not also released on VHS videotape.  It was the first DVD of the series that included the option of either a two-channel stereo or a Dolby 5.1 channel surround sound soundtrack.  It was the final title in the "View from the Vault" series, and was followed eight months later by The Closing of Winterland DVD/CD set.

Content

View From The Vault is the fourth installment in the View from the Vault series. It is also the longest one, with four discs. The concerts were part of the Apart and Together Tour, commonly known as the Dylan & The Dead tour. There would be three sets to each show. The first two sets would be like any other Grateful Dead concert, and the third would be with Bob Dylan. The album has only the Grateful Dead's sets from these shows.

Reception

The two shows, especially the latter one, have been highly regarded. They are considered some of the best shows of 1987. It has gotten positive ratings from critics.

Track listing

July 24, 1987 – Oakland Stadium, Oakland, California
Disc 1 
First set:
"Funiculi Funicula" (Luigi Denza) – 3:52
"Jack Straw" (Bob Weir, Robert Hunter) - 5:59
"Mississippi Half-Step Uptown Toodeloo" (Jerry Garcia, Hunter) - 9:30
"My Brother Esau" (Weir, John Barlow) - 5:01
"Friend Of The Devil" (Garcia, John Dawson, Hunter) - 9:06
"Me & My Uncle" > (John Phillips) - 3:08
"Big River" (Johnny Cash) - 6:07
"When Push Comes To Shove" (Garcia, Hunter) - 5:26
"Far From Me" (Brent Mydland) - 4:24
"Cassidy" > (Weir, Barlow) - 6:57
"Deal" (Garcia, Hunter) - 7:57
Notes

Disc 2 
Second set:
"Hell In A Bucket" > (Weir, Barlow) - 5:58
"Scarlet Begonias" (Garcia, Hunter) - 7:36
"Playing In The Band" > (Weir, Mickey Hart, Hunter) - 10:46
"Drums" > (Bill Kreutzmann, Hart) - 7:01
"Space" > (Grateful Dead) - 5:49
"Uncle John's Band" > (Garcia, Hunter) - 7:17
"Dear Mr. Fantasy" > (Jim Capaldi, Steve Winwood, Chris Wood) - 6:26
"I Need A Miracle" > (Weir, Barlow) - 3:35
"Bertha" > (Garcia, Hunter) - 7:01
"Sugar Magnolia" (Weir, Hunter) - 9:22

July 26, 1987 – Anaheim Stadium, Anaheim, California
Disc 3 
First set:
"Iko Iko" (James Crawford) - 6:36
"New Minglewood Blues" (Noah Lewis) - 7:53
"Tons of Steel" (Mydland) - 5:36
"West L.A. Fadeaway" (Garcia, Hunter) - 7:48 
"When I Paint My Masterpiece" > (Bob Dylan) - 3:45
"Mexicali Blues" (Weir, Barlow) - 4:51
"Bird Song" > (Garcia, Hunter) - 8:41
"Promised Land" (Chuck Berry) - 4:26
Note

Disc 4 
Second set:
"Shakedown Street" > (Garcia, Hunter) - 12:23
"Looks Like Rain" > (Weir, Barlow) - 8:23
"Terrapin Station" > (Garcia, Hunter) - 11:47
"Drums" > (Kreutzmann, Hart) - 8:36
"Space" > (Grateful Dead) - 6:23
"The Other One" > (Weir, Kreutzmann) - 6:47
"Stella Blue" > (Garcia, Hunter) - 7:12
"Throwing Stones" > (Weir, Barlow) - 8:48
"Not Fade Away" (Buddy Holly, Norman Petty) - 7:51
Notes

Personnel 

Grateful Dead

Jerry Garcia – guitar, vocals
Bob Weir – guitar, vocals
Phil Lesh – bass, vocals
Brent Mydland – keyboards, vocals
Bill Kreutzmann – drums, percussion
Mickey Hart – drums, percussion
Len Dell'Amico - director, co-producer

See also
 View from the Vault, Volume One
 View from the Vault, Volume Two
 View from the Vault, Volume Three

References

04
2003 video albums
Live video albums
2003 live albums